

The Korea Computer Center (KCC) is the North Korean government information technology research center. It was founded on 24 October 1990. KCC, which administered the .kp country code top-level domain until 2011, employs more than 1,000 people.

KCC operates eight development and production centers, as well as eleven regional information centers.  It runs the KCC Information Technology College and its Information Technology Institute.  The KCC has branch offices in China, Germany, Syria and the United Arab Emirates. It has an interest in Linux research, and started the development of the Red Star OS distribution localised for North Korea.

KCC is a part of the political establishment and not entirely an IT company per se. Its technological state and general modernity are seen as lagging well behind the rest of the world, even with the general zeitgeist in North Korea. For example, the .kp ccTLD was registered in 2007, but KCC did not manage to get a working registry for three years, despite the support of a European company. KCC has still not implemented a working ccTLD infrastructure, something the North Korean government has had as a goal for several years.

While KCC mainly works on projects within  North Korea, it has since 2001 served clients in Europe, China, South Korea, Japan, and the Middle East. It operates Naenara, North Korea's official web portal.

Nosotek is another North Korean IT venture company that develops computer games; two of them were published by News Corporation. Another such company is the Pyongyang Information Center.

In early 2015, the KCC was reorganized, with all functions not related to the development of Red Star OS being transferred to other entities.

Products 
 "Sam heug" search engine
 "Naenara" web browser
 "Chosun Jang-Gi", a computer game
 Kwangmyong, North Korea's closed national intranet
 "Korean Dishes" (Chosŏn ryori), a food-related website
 "Hana", a Korean language input method editor
 "Koryo", English-Korean/Korean-English translation software using an electronic pen
 "Nunbora", a Korean language voice recognition software
 "Pulgunbyol" (Red Star OS), a Linux distribution
 "Cyber Friend", a video conference system
 "Cyber Star", an electronic education system
 "SilverStar Paduk", a Go computer game
 "HMS Player", a media player
 Samjiyon tablet

See also 

 Internet in North Korea
 Economy of North Korea

References

External links 
Korea Computer Centre

Government agencies of North Korea
Information technology in North Korea
Computer science institutes
Research institutes in North Korea
1990 establishments in North Korea
Information technology research institutes
Computer companies of North Korea